A Night at the Chinese Opera is an opera in three acts by Judith Weir, who also wrote the libretto. Aside from an earlier opera for children, this was Weir's first full-scale opera, written on commission from the BBC for performance by Kent Opera. Weir incorporated an early Chinese play of the Yuan dynasty, The Orphan of Zhao, as the centrepiece of Act 2 of her opera.

The work received its premiere on 8 July 1987 at the Everyman Theatre, Cheltenham, England. The Opera magazine critic noted that "few new operas have recently made so diverting a first impression as A Night at the Chinese Opera, partly on its intrinsic musico-dramatic merits, partly through the style of production".

The outer acts are fully scored for the chamber orchestra in 'closed-forms' such as aria, sextet, seven-part motet but the Yuan play is mostly scored for flute, lower strings and percussion.

Roles

Performance history
Kent Opera subsequently took the opera on tour to Dartford, Canterbury, Plymouth, Southsea and Eastbourne during their 1987–88 season. Santa Fe Opera gave the US premiere of the opera in July 1989. The second British production was at the Glasgow Royal Concert Hall on 26 February 1999 as a semi-staged concert. A third British production was by the Royal Academy of Music in March 2006. The first staged production in Scotland, at Scottish Opera, was in April 2008. British Youth Opera performed it during September 2012.

The Kent Opera production was recorded for television by the BBC in 1988, directed by Barrie Gavin.

Synopsis
Place: China
Time: 13th-century

Chao Sun is an explorer and mapmaker who is exiled from the city of Loyan.  His son Chao Lin becomes the supervisor of the building of a canal.  His workers include a group of actors.

One evening, the actors/workers perform the old Chinese opera The Chao Family Orphan.  The older drama tells of the evil General Tuan-Ku, who causes his servant Chao and his wife to commit suicide by forging a seemingly official letter from the Emperor instructing Chao to take his own life.  Their young son is left behind as an orphan.  Unwittingly, the General later adopts and raises the child as his own son.  Twenty years later, there is a conspiracy to overthrow the emperor.  The orphan gradually learns his true birth identity and the fate of his parents, and joins the plot for revenge.  An earthquake, however, interrupts the conspiracy and the actors are arrested.

Chao Lin's work on the canal is praised.  At one point, when he is surveying the canal, Chao meets an old woman who tells him of what happened to his father.  In parallel to the Chao Family Orphan story, Chao Lin plans vengeance on his father's enemies.  However, Chao Lin is captured and executed for his conspiracy.  The actors who were performing The Chao Family Orphan then return to complete the play, where the son does succeed in avenging his father against General Tuan-Ku.

Recordings
 NMC D060: Timothy Robinson, Michael Chance, Frances McCafferty, Gwion Thomas, Michael George; Scottish Chamber Orchestra; Andrew Parrott, conductor (recorded live, February 1999, Glasgow Concert Hall)

References
Notes

Sources
Holden, Amanda (Ed.), The New Penguin Opera Guide, New York: Penguin Putnam, 2001.

External links
 Chester Novello publisher page on A Night at the Chinese Opera
 David Conway, blog posting from The Social Affairs Unit on A Night at the Chinese Opera, 24 March 2006.

Operas by Judith Weir
English-language operas
Operas
1987 operas
Operas set in China